Arya Wiraraja was named by Kertanegara of Singhasari governor in Sumenep Regency in the east part of Madura Island but in 1292 joined forces with the ruler of Kediri, Jayakatwang, in his rebellion.
The battle ended with the death of Kertanegara.
Jayakatwang immediately encountered opposition from Raden Wijaya, which defeated reached Madura and, unaware of his treason, asked support to Arya Wiraraja, which helped him to get the crown in 1294.

Later he declared himself independent at Lumajang.
He died in 1331.

Bibliography

References 

Indonesian monarchs
Javanese people
14th-century Indonesian people
13th-century Indonesian people